Humberto Bruni Lamanna, (born March 26, 1957, in Caracas Venezuela) descended from an Italian family, is a Classical Guitar concert artist.

Musical studies

The musical studies of Humberto Bruni began at age fourteen, when he took the first music lessons from his father, Blas Bruni Celli.

Shortly, he began his studies as a guitar performer under the guidance of Flaminia De Sola, at the "Juan Manuel Olivares" Conservatory of Music, in Caracas. Flaminia De Sola was a distinguished disciple of Andrés Segovia at the Accademia Musicale Chigiana in Siena, Italy, founded by Count Guido Chigi-Saracini in 1932 as an international centre for advanced musical studies.

In 1973 at age fifteen, Humberto Bruni made his first public appearance with great success in a solo recital, after just a few months of musical training.

In 1980, Bruni obtained the degree "Profesor Ejecutante de Guitarra" (English: "Performer and Professor of Guitar").

Career as a soloist with orchestra

During 1980, Bruni made his first appearance as a soloist with the Orquesta Sinfónica Simón Bolívar (Simón Bolívar Symphony Orchestra), under the baton of Alberto Grau, at the Teresa Carreño Cultural Complex. Alberto Grau, founder and director of the world-renowned Schola Cantorum de Venezuela, conducted the Fantasía para un GentilHombre by Joaquín Rodrigo. The performance by Bruni of this Concerto for Guitar and Orchestra obtained such an incredible standing ovation that spanned for several consecutive minutes.

In 1984, Bruni played the uttermost difficult piece for Guitar, the Concierto de Aranjuez for Guitar and Orchestra by Joaquín Rodrigo conducted by José Antonio Abreu. In 1995, UNESCO appointed Abreu as a Special Ambassador for the Development of a Global Network of Youth and Children Orchestras and Choirs.

International career

In 1980 at age 23, Bruni made his international debut in the United States of America with the Massachusetts Symphony Orchestra conducted by Harry Levenson at the Mechanics Hall, Worcester, Massachusetts. He also made a tour, including several recitals in the Boston area and in the Pacific coast.

In December 1980, Bruni was admitted at the New England Conservatory of Music, in Boston, which is the oldest independent Conservatory of Music in the United States of America. There, he made graduate Classical Guitar studies with Robert Paul Sullivan.

In 1984, Bruni got the degree "Master of Music" in Guitar Performance.

On May 13, 1984, Peter Clemente and Bruni, performed for the first time along the US East Coast the "Concierto Madrigal" for Two Guitars and Orchestra by Joaquín Rodrigo.

Since then, Bruni has given a considerable number of recitals and public appearances as soloist with orchestras in the United States, Venezuela, Caribbean Islands, Spain and  Germany.

Other fields of interest
Humberto Bruni holds a Systems Engineering Degree obtained at the Universidad Metropolitana, in Caracas, Venezuela.

His dissertation for obtaining the Systems Engineering Degree, involved Artificial Intelligence,  specifically Artificial Neural Networks. Due to the novelty and innovations introduced by Bruni's Graduate Dissertation, the Universidad Metropolitana awarded it with the highest honors by the fulfillment of such a cutting-edge technology introduced for the first time in that institution.

Among other studies, Bruni graduated in 2002 with honors at the IESA institute (Spanish: Instituto de Estudios Superiores de Administración) in Caracas, Venezuela, in an Executive MBA, (Spanish: PAG Programa Avanzado de Gerencia).

Inventions

Humberto Bruni has a powerful influence from his father, Dr. Blas Bruni Celli, who is a medical doctor in pathology and besides he is an avid amateur pianist. Dr. Bruni explained to his son, at a very young age, the musculature anatomy of the human body arms and fingers.

Dr. Bruni Celli explained to his son the anatomic causes which are responsible for the ring finger drastic weakness in human hands.

Since then, Humberto Bruni has been attracted with great intensity to overcome the ring finger weakness, as well as the development of the independence of the fingers in both hands.

At age 14, Humberto Bruni invented his first device specially designed for his father. The invention was intended to exercise and strengthen the ring finger musculature. After a very short period of time, the results in the independence and strength of Humberto's father ring finger were just remarkable.

This first experiment was a real milestone for Humberto Bruni of countless and meticulous observations about the mechanical nature of the human hands.

Humberto Bruni's knowledge of digital electronics and his proficiency in computer programming, have led him design and develop many inventions to achieve the fingers independence in both hands of the human being.

Among his inventions, there are several computer-controlled devices. These inventions have been tested with several guitar students, and it has been proven that they have statistical significance in developing the inter independence of the human hand fingers.

The first prototypes are about to be patented in the United States of America.

Present Activities
Bruni has his own recording studio specially designed for Classical Guitar Recordings and small Music Ensembles in Pompano Beach, Florida. Humberto Bruni is also a Recording Engineer, graduated with the Highest Honor from SAE (Florida) where he was awarded as The Valedictorian of Class 2019 (January, 17) obtaining the unsurpassable rareness PGA=99.44/100 among the two hundred honorary graduands that day.

Presently, Bruni is working on the recording of an "Anthology of Spanish Music for Guitar", which spanned since the Discovery of America at the End of Century IV up to XX Century: "Five Centuries of Evolution of the Academic Music as well as the Classical".

He is now working toward the Transcription for Modern Classical Classical Guitar written by Johann Sebastian Bach for Lute.

Bruni is writing an essay named "Breaking the Bach Code", which deals with the contribution of Johann Sebastian Bach to the modern guitar technique by means of several discoveries of logical fingering patterns found in Bach Lute Music.

External links
 Official website

Venezuelan classical guitarists
Male guitarists
1957 births
Living people